Alfred Stanley Thompson (11 May 1908 – 23 July 1980) was an English professional footballer who played as an outside right in the Football League for Brighton & Hove Albion, Hartlepools United and Exeter City.

Life and career
Thompson was born in Durham in 1908. He played football for Durham City before signing for Brighton & Hove Albion in late 1929. He stayed with the club for nearly six seasons, but was never able to establish himself in the side. He returned to the north-east to join Third Division club Hartlepools United. In the opening match of the season, against Halifax Town, he scored a late winner when his corner kick "completely bamboozled" the opposing goalkeeper who could only succeed in pushing the ball into the net via the post. Thompson continued as a regular at outside right, scoring 11 goals from 34 league appearances, but was given a free transfer at the end of the season. He finished his Football League career with three matches for Exeter City as part of a month's trial. Although he returned to Hartlepools for the 1937–38 season, he played no more first-team football. Thompson died in Scarborough in 1980 at the age of 72.

References

1908 births
1980 deaths
Sportspeople from Durham, England
Footballers from County Durham
English footballers
Association football outside forwards
Durham City A.F.C. players
Brighton & Hove Albion F.C. players
Hartlepool United F.C. players
Exeter City F.C. players
English Football League players